The 2016–17 season is Queen of the South's fourth consecutive season back in the second tier of Scottish football and their fourth season in the Scottish Championship, having been promoted as champions from the Scottish Second Division at the end of the 2012–13 season. Queens will also be competing in the Challenge Cup, League Cup and the Scottish Cup.

Summary
Queen of the South finished sixth in the Scottish Championship.

The club reached the sixth round of the Challenge Cup, the third round of the League Cup and the third round of the Scottish Cup.

Management
The club began the 2016-17 season under the management of Gavin Skelton and he remained in charge until 7 November 2016 when he resigned for personal reasons. Former club captain and current football development manager Jim Thomson was placed in temporary charge along with another former club captain Graeme Robertson, who was back home for one month after coaching in China. Gary Naysmith was appointed the club's manager along with his assistant Dougie Anderson on 1 December 2016, having previously been in-charge of part-time club East Fife.

Results & fixtures

Pre season

Scottish Championship

Scottish Challenge Cup

Scottish League Cup

Scottish Cup

Player statistics

Captains

|-

|-

|-

Squad 
Last updated 4 January 2018

|}

Disciplinary record

Top scorers 
Last updated 6 May 2017

Clean sheets
{| class="wikitable" style="font-size: 95%; text-align: center;"
|-
!width=15|
!width=15|
!width=15|
!width=150|Name
!width=80|Scottish Championship
!width=80|Challenge Cup
!width=80|League Cup
!width=80|Scottish Cup
!width=80|Total
|-
|1
|GK
|
|Lee Robinson
|8
|2
|3
|0
|13
|-
|20
|GK
|
|James Atkinson
|0
|0
|0
|0
|0
|-
|
|
|
! Totals !! 8 !! 2 !! 3 !! 0 !! 13

Team statistics

League table

Division summary

Management statistics
Last updated 6 May 2017

Transfers

Players in

Players out

See also
List of Queen of the South F.C. seasons

Notes

References

2016andndash;17
Queen of the South